Loree is an unincorporated community in Conecuh County, Alabama, United States.

History
Loree was named in honor of the daughter of Archie F. Davis, who served as the first postmaster. Loree was formerly home to a school, sawmill, cotton gin, and syrup mill.

A post office operated under the name Loree from 1904 to 1909.

References

Unincorporated communities in Conecuh County, Alabama
Unincorporated communities in Alabama